Baruch Shmailov (born 9 February 1994) is an Israeli judoka. He competes in the under 66 kg weight category, and won a gold medal in the 2022 World Masters in Jerusalem. Shmailov also won a bronze in the 2017 World Masters, as well as a silver at the 2018 World Masters. As of December 2022, Shmailov is ranked #3 in -66 kg weight category. He competed for Israel at the 2020 Summer Olympics, finishing in fifth place.

Biography
Shmailov grew up in Hadera, Israel, in a household of Jewish background. He was raised by his mother Elza, a solderer in an electronics company. When he was 4 his parents got divorced. At the age of 6 his mother sent him to practice Jujutsu and Karate and a year later he began to practice Judo. When he was 11, during a training in the Judo club in Hadera, a former judoka and politician Yoel Razvozov came to visit. He recognized Shmailov's potential and recommended to transfer him to train at the famous Wingate Institute under better conditions.

2014-19
On September 19, 2014, at the age of 20, Shmailov took part in the under 21 European championship which was held in Bucharest and won the gold medal after winning every match by ippon. About a month later, he participated in the 2014 World U21 Championships in Fort Lauderdale and won the bronze in the under 66 kg category after losing the semi-final match to Japan's Hifumi Abe and defeating Ukraine's Bogdan Iadov in the bronze medal match. On November 14, he won the 2014 European U23 Championships after defeating Andraž Jereb of Slovenia in the final.

On March 20, Shmailov won his first medal in a senior competition when he won a silver medal at the 2015 Tbilisi Grand Prix. He defeated former world champion Georgii Zantaraia in the semi-final and lost to Mongolia's Tumurkhuleg Davaadorj in the final. On October 7, he took part in Israel's national championship and won the gold medal after he defeated Tohar Butbul in the final.

In September 2016, Shmailov participated in the Zagreb Grand Prix and won the silver medal. On March 10, 2017, he won the bronze medal at the Baku Grand Slam after defeating Nijat Shikhalizada of Azerbaijan in the medal match. Less than a month later he won the bronze at the 2017 Antalya Grand Prix.

On December 16, 2017, Shmailov took part in the prestigious World Masters which was held in St. Petersburg and won the bronze medal after he defeated Brazil's Charles Chibana in the medal match. On February 23, 2018, he won a bronze medal at the Düsseldorf Grand Slam after defeating Russia's Yakub Shamilov in golden score of the medal match when he managed to get a pinning hold on his opponent.

Shmailov competed in the 2018 World Masters tournament and won the silver medal. In the quarter finals he defeated then European champion Adrian Gomboc of Slovenia by ippon, in the semi finals he defeated Daniel Cargnin of Brazil by ippon as well, and in the final lost to Joshiro Maruyama of Japan by ippon.

2020-present
In 2021, he won the silver medal in his event at the World Masters held in Doha, Qatar.

After a long contest with Tal Flicker, Shmailov was chosen to represent Israel at the 2020 Summer Olympics in the men's 66 kg weight category.In his first match, Shmailov beat Mozambique's Kevin Loforte by ippon. At the round of 16, he beat Australian Nathan Katz by waza-ari, advancing to the quarterfinals. There, he met former European champion Vazha Margvelashvili of Georgia, losing by ippon and turning to compete at the repechage for a chance to win a bronze medal.
In his next match, Shmailov beat Slovenia's former European champion Adrian Gomboc, beating him by waza-ari in golden score and advancing to fight for the bronze. Shmailov lost the bronze medal match to Brzilian two-time Pan American champion Daniel Cargnin, finishing in fifth place.

He won the gold medal in his event at the 2022 Judo Grand Slam Tel Aviv held in Tel Aviv, Israel.

Personal life 
Shmailov is married to Bulgarian-born judoka Betina "Beti" Temelkova, who competes for Israel since 2017, although she received her full Israeli citizenship only in 2019.

Titles
Sources:

References

External links

 
 Baruch Shmailov at the European Judo Union
 
 
 
 
 
 

1994 births
Living people
Israeli male judoka
Jewish martial artists
Jewish Israeli sportspeople
European Games competitors for Israel
Judoka at the 2015 European Games
Judoka at the 2020 Summer Olympics
Medalists at the 2020 Summer Olympics
Olympic medalists in judo
Olympic bronze medalists for Israel
Olympic judoka of Israel
People from Hadera